I Am Yours is a 2013 Norwegian drama film written and directed by Iram Haq. The film was selected as the Norwegian entry for the Best Foreign Language Film at the 86th Academy Awards, but was not nominated.

Cast
 Amrita Acharia as Mina
 Ola Rapace as Jesper
 Prince Singh as Felix
 Rabia Noreen as Samina
 Trond Fausa as Martin
 Jesper Malm as Simon
 Sudhir Kumar Kohli as Mina's dad
 Assad Siddique as Felix's Dad
 Sara Khorami as Felix's Stepmom

Accolades
I Am Yours received two Amanda nominations: Best Actress (Acharia) and Best Screenplay (Haq). It was chosen by Norway's Oscar committee to be submitted as Norway's candidate for the Academy Award for Best Foreign Language Film.

See also
 List of submissions to the 86th Academy Awards for Best Foreign Language Film
 List of Norwegian submissions for the Academy Award for Best Foreign Language Film

References

External links
 Official site
 Press kit
 

2013 films
2013 drama films
Norwegian drama films
2010s Norwegian-language films